Street Hawk is an American action television series that aired for 14 episodes on ABC in 1985. The series is a Limekiln and Templar Production in association with Universal Television. Its central characters were created by Paul M. Belous and Robert Wolterstorff, and its core format was developed by Bruce Lansbury, who had initially commissioned the program's creation. This series was originally planned for the fall of 1984, Mondays at 8:00PM Eastern/7:00PM Central; however, ABC executives changed their minds when the summer series Call to Glory did well, and Street Hawk was pushed to mid-season. Street Hawk made its debut on January 4, 1985, on ABC at 9:00PM Eastern/8:00PM Central and ran until May 16, 1985.

Plot 
The premise of the show is narrated before every episode during the opening titles, voiced by Ernie Anderson:

This is Jesse Mach, an ex-motorcycle cop, injured in the line of duty. Now a police troubleshooter, he's been recruited for a top secret government mission to ride Street Hawk -- an all-terrain attack motorcycle designed to fight urban crime, capable of incredible speeds up to three hundred miles an hour, and immense firepower. Only one man, federal agent Norman Tuttle, knows Jesse Mach's true identity. The man...the machine...Street Hawk.

The pilot episode shows the backstory: Jesse Mach's (Rex Smith) earlier work as a police officer and amateur dirt-bike racer; his recruitment by Norman Tuttle for the Street Hawk project; and the capabilities of the motorcycle and its computer backend, from providing the motorcycle rider with real-time mission information, to assisting the motorcycle during its high-speed "hyperthrust" runs.

All subsequent episodes show Mach leading a double life, a police public relation officer by day, and crimefighter by night. Street Hawk is regarded as a lawless vigilante and a public relations embarrassment by the police, especially by Mach's commanding officer Captain Leo Altobelli (Richard Venture). Each episode deals with a specific crime or mission, and there are no multi-episode story arcs.

Music 
The musical theme was composed by Tangerine Dream and produced by Christopher Franke, and a modified version (which was featured in the pilot episode during the sequence where Mach took the bike out for the first time) appeared on their album Le Parc, titled Le Parc (L.A. - Streethawk).

The motorcycle

The motorcycle in the pilot episode was based on a 1983 Honda XL500 trail bike. Motorcyclist Magazine staffers Jeff Karr and Dexter Ford built the motorcycles for the pilot in their Hancock Park, Los Angeles garage, combining parts from an electric start Honda 500 Ascot with the chassis of a dual-sport XL500 on-/off-road bike. The motorcycles used in the series were based on 1984 Honda XR500s, using the electric-start engine of the street-based Ascot, creating the first-known electric-start Honda dual-sport motorcycles. The stunt coordinator insisted on using the turbocharged Honda CX500 street bike for performance-related sequences, but the motorcycles actually used for the stunt shots were based on Honda CR250 racing dirt bikes. The bodywork of the pilot motorcycle was designed by Andrew Probert and the series motorcycles were redesigned by Ron Cobb.

During filming, the fiberglass bike parts constantly flew off the bike during the course of stunt work.  The film stunt second unit crew always had six bikes standing by to replace the main bike's jump or maneuver.  When the first unit was on stage at Universal Studios, the second stunt crew were on location filming with a stunt biker performing with the bike.  The stunt bikes were always in the effects shop of Universal Studios, being repaired or replaced with parts.  A motorcycle shop, not far from the studio, three miles on Lankershim Boulevard, always supplied new frames and wheels for the stunt bikes. Winfield Special Projects in Canoga Park made all body panels and special effects. Eric Thaler from Austria was in charge of the project at Winfield.

List of episodes

Home media

There have been at least two official releases of the Street Hawk pilot movie on VHS.  One was from MCA Canada and contained the full 90-minute pilot (actually 76 minutes or so without commercials), and the other was the U.S. MCA release that ran about 60 minutes.  There are short bits of footage that are unique to each release; for example, even though the U.S. version is shorter, it does include a line or two of dialogue not present in the Canadian version.  Other differences include a "blue lightning"-style primary weapon in the Canadian version (whereas the red "laser beam" from the rest of the series appears on the U.S. release) and actual stunt jumps on the U.S. tape instead of "matted-in" fake jumps in the Canadian version.

On July 13, 2010, Shout! Factory released Street Hawk: The Complete Series, a 4 DVD box set featuring all 13 episodes of the series.  Special features include an all new 41 minute documentary titled "The Making Of A Legend" and an unaired pilot featuring different Street Hawk firepower.

Novelizations

In Britain four novels based on the series were published by Target Books:

 Street Hawk by Jack Roberts, adapted from the pilot
 Cons At Large by Jack Roberts, adapted from the episodes "The Adjuster" and "The Unsinkable 453"
 Golden Eyes by Charles Gale, adapted from the episodes "Follow The Yellow Gold Road" and "Dog Eat Dog"
 Danger On Target by David Deutsch, adapted from the episodes "Murder is a Novel Idea" and "Hot Target"

Reception
The series, which was aired by Doordarshan in India, was a roaring success especially among adolescent males. This even spawned the introduction of a MTB-style bicycle named "Streetcat", aimed at that market segment.

Toy

In Brazil the Street Hawk toys were produced by Glasslite. One item is the "Moto Laser MRX-1", a slot track with two slot bikes: the Street Hawk and a yellow model. A Jesse Mach action figure was also released.

In the United Kingdom and some countries, a Street Hawk stunt bike was released by Ertl Company. Roughly the same size as standard miniature ERTL vehicles, the toy had a plastic rider, on the motorcycle powered by a friction wheel. The packaging suggests various stunts that the owner can attempt to perform with the toy.

In India, Funskool, the company manufacturing G.I. Joe: A Real American Hero, gave R.A.M. a black paint job, replaced the sidecar with Snake Eyes wearing a silver visor, and sold it under the Street Hawk name.

See also
 Cyclone (1987 film)

References

External links

 StreetHawkOnline.com

American Broadcasting Company original programming
1985 American television series debuts
1985 American television series endings
1980s American science fiction television series
American superhero television series
Television series by Universal Television
English-language television shows
Motorcycle television series
Universal Pictures franchises
Television shows set in Chicago